The 2008–09 CEV Champions League was the 50th edition of the highest level European volleyball club competition organised by the European Volleyball Confederation.

Participating teams

League round
24 teams will be drawn to 6 pools of 4 teams each.
The 1st – 2nd ranked and four with best score  3rd teams ranked will qualify for the Play-off 1/8 finals.
The 2 remaining 3rd ranked  teams and the two 4th ranked teams with the best score move to CEV Cup. The remaining 4th ranked teams are eliminated.

Pool A

|}

Pool B

|}

Pool C

|}

Pool D

|}

Pool E

|}

Pool F

|}

8th Finals

|}

First leg

|}

Second leg

|}

4th Finals

|}

First leg

|}

Second leg

|}

Final Four
 Place:  Prague
All times are Central European Summer Time (UTC+02:00).

Semifinals

|}

3rd place match

|}

Final

|}

Final standings

Awards

Most Valuable Player
  Matey Kaziyski (Trentino Volley)
Best Scorer
  Jochen Schöps (Iskra Odintsovo)
Best Spiker
  Martin Lébl (Lube Banca Marche Macerata)
Best Server
  Emanuele Birarelli (Trentino Volley)

Best Blocker
  Michał Winiarski (Trentino Volley)
Best Receiver
  Plamen Konstantinov (Iraklis Thessaloniki)
Best Libero
  Aleksey Verbov (Iskra Odintsovo)
Best Setter
  Aleksandr Butko (Iskra Odintsovo)

External links
 2008/09 European Champions League

CEV Champions League
2008 in volleyball
2009 in volleyball